The men's horizontal bar was one of eight gymnastics events on the Gymnastics at the 1896 Summer Olympics programme. It was held on 9 April, as the sixth gymnastics event. 15 athletes from four nations entered the competition. Two winners were announced, with Hermann Weingärtner winning his first individual gold medal, which was added to his two team gold medals and his three other individual medals. His countryman, Alfred Flatow, won his first individual medal.

Background

This was the first appearance of the event, which is one of the five apparatus events held every time there were apparatus events at the Summer Olympics (no apparatus events were held in 1900, 1908, 1912, or 1920). The field consisted of 10 Germans and 5 gymnasts from 3 other nations.

Competition format

Judges awarded the prizes, but little is known of the scoring and rankings.

Schedule

The men's parallel bars was held in the evening of the fourth day of events. It was the sixth gymnastics event held that day, and went late enough that the remaining two had to be postponed until the next day.

Results

Schuhmann performed for the audience, rather than the judges, with "circus tricks."

References

Sources
  (Digitally available at )
  (Excerpt available at )
 

Men's horizontal bar
Men's 1896